910 Anneliese (prov. designation:  or ) is a dark background asteroid, approximately  in diameter, located in the outer regions of the asteroid belt. It was discovered on 1 March 1919, by astronomer Karl Reinmuth at the Heidelberg-Königstuhl State Observatory in southwest Germany. The carbonaceous C-type asteroid (Ch) has a rotation period of 11.3 hours and is likely spherical in shape. It was named by German astronomer Julius Dick after his friend "Anneliese".

Orbit and classification 

Anneliese is a non-family asteroid of the main belt's background population when applying the hierarchical clustering method to its proper orbital elements. It orbits the Sun in the outer asteroid belt at a distance of 2.5–3.4 AU once every 5.00 years (1,828 days; semi-major axis of 2.93 AU). Its orbit has an eccentricity of 0.15 and an inclination of 9° with respect to the ecliptic. The body's observation arc begins at Heidelberg Observatory on 19 March 1919, or 18 days after its official discovery observation.

Naming 

This minor planet was named after "Anneliese", an acquaintance of the German astronomer Julius Dick from the Babelsberg Observatory, who suggested the asteroid's name. The  was also mentioned in The Names of the Minor Planets by Paul Herget in 1955.

Physical characteristics 

In the Bus–Binzel SMASS classification, Anneliese is a hydrated carbonaceous C-type asteroid (Ch).

Rotation period 

In June 2015, a rotational lightcurve of Anneliese was obtained from photometric observations by Uruguayan astronomer Eduardo Álvarez at the Los Algarrobos Observatory . Lightcurve analysis gave a well-defined rotation period of  hours with a brightness variation of  magnitude, indicative of a spherical, non-elongated shape. At the time Anneliese was one of only 17 three-digit numbered asteroids for which no period was published. In May 2015, Julian Oey at the Blue Mountains Observatory , Australia, determined a concurring period of  hours with an amplitude of  magnitude. In May 2015 a collaboration of Spanish amateur astronomers including Alfonso Garceràn , Amadeo Macias , Enrique Mansego , Pedro Rodriguez  and Juan de Haro  measured a period of  hours—or half the period solution of the other observations, with an amplitude of  magnitude.

Diameter and albedo 

An asteroid occultation, observed on 14 September 2012, gave a best-fit ellipse dimension of 48.0 × 48.0 kilometers. These timed observations are taken when the asteroid passes in front of a distant star. However the quality of the measurement is rated poorly.

References

External links 
 Lightcurve Database Query (LCDB), at www.minorplanet.info
 Dictionary of Minor Planet Names, Google books
 Discovery Circumstances: Numbered Minor Planets (1)-(5000) – Minor Planet Center
 
 

000910
Discoveries by Karl Wilhelm Reinmuth
Named minor planets
000910
19190301